Tijmen Eising (born 27 March 1991) is a Dutch cyclist, who currently rides for UCI Continental team .

Major results

Road

2008
 5th Overall Valromey Tour
 10th Overall Trofeo Karlsberg
2009
 1st Stage 4 Trofeo Karlsberg
 6th Road race, European Junior Road Championships
 6th Overall Sparkassen Münsterland Tour
2010
 3rd Road race, National Under-23 Road Championships
2011
 4th Overall Carpathia Couriers Paths
1st Stages 2 & 4
 6th Overall Tour of Malopolska
1st Stage 1
2012
 2nd Slag om Norg
2013
 2nd Slag om Norg
2014
 1st Stage 1 (TTT) Czech Cycling Tour
 3rd Dwars door Drenthe
 7th Internationale Wielertrofee Jong Maar Moedig
2015
 2nd Dorpenomloop Rucphen
 9th Overall Volta ao Alentejo
2016
 7th Ster van Zwolle
2017
 1st 
 3rd Ronde van Limburg
 10th Profronde van Noord-Holland
2020
 1st 
2021
 1st Stage 1 (TTT) Okolo Jižních Čech

Cyclo-cross

2007–2008
 1st  National Junior Championships
 Junior Superprestige
1st Vorselaar
2nd Gieten
2nd Diegem
2nd Veghel-Eerde
 UCI Junior World Cup
2nd Hofstade
3rd Milan
2008–2009
 1st  UCI Junior World Championships
 1st  UEC European Junior Championships
 1st  Overall UCI Junior World Cup
1st Tábor
1st Pijnacker
1st Roubaix
3rd Heusden-Zolder
 1st Overall Junior Superprestige
1st Ruddervoorde
1st Asper-Gavere
1st Hamme-Zogge
1st Diegem
1st Vorselaar
2nd Hoogstraten
 1st Sluitingsprijs Oostmalle Juniors
 1st Kasteelcross Zonnebeke Juniors
 2nd National Junior Championships
 2nd Krawatencross Juniors
2009–2010
 Under-23 GvA Trophy
2nd Azencross
 UCI Under-23 World Cup
3rd Heusden-Zolder
3rd Roubaix
 3rd Steinmaur
 7th UCI Under-23 World Championships
2010–2011
 UCI Under-23 World Cup
2nd Heusden-Zolder
 Under-23 GvA Trophy
3rd Sluitingsprijs Oostmalle
3rd Azencross
3rd Grand Prix Rouwmoer
 Under-23 Superprestige
3rd Gieten
 5th UCI Under-23 World Championships
2011–2012
 Under-23 GvA Trophy
1st Grand Prix Rouwmoer
3rd Azencross
 Under-23 Superprestige
2nd Ruddervoorde
 2nd Centrumcross Surhuisterveen
 2nd Openingsveldrit van Harderwijk
 2nd Vlaamse Industrieprijs Bosduin Under-23
2012–2013
 Under-23 BPost Bank Trophy
2nd Krawatencross
 4th UCI Under-23 World Championships

References

External links

1991 births
Living people
Dutch male cyclists
Cyclo-cross cyclists
Sportspeople from Emmen, Netherlands
Cyclists from Drenthe
20th-century Dutch people
21st-century Dutch people